Eudy Simelane (11 March 1977 – 28 April 2008) was a South African footballer who played for the South Africa national team and an LGBT rights activist. She was raped and murdered in her hometown of KwaThema, Springs, Gauteng.

Early life
Simelane was born in KwaThema, Gauteng, South Africa.

Football
Simelane played as a midfielder for Springs Home Sweepers F.C. and the South Africa national team. She also coached four teams and was studying to be a referee.

Death
Simelane's partially clothed body was found in a creek in KwaThema. She had been abducted, gang raped, beaten, and stabbed 25 times in the face, chest, and legs. She had been one of the first women to live openly as a lesbian in KwaThema. A report by the international NGO ActionAid, backed by the South African Human Rights Commission, suggested that her murder was a hate crime committed against her because of her sexual orientation.

According to local gay rights organization The Triangle Project, the practice of "corrective rape" is widespread in South Africa, whereby men rape lesbians purportedly to "cure" them of their sexual orientation.

The trial of four suspected attackers began on 11 February 2009 in Delmas, Mpumalanga. One of the four alleged attackers pleaded guilty to rape and murder and was sentenced to 32 years' imprisonment. In September 2009, another was convicted of murder, rape, and robbery, and sentenced to life plus 35 years, but the remaining two accused were acquitted.

Honours
A miniature bridge was erected in KwaThema, Springs, Gauteng, in her honor in 2009.

References

External links
 

1977 births
2008 deaths
Corrective rape
2008 murders in South Africa
South African LGBT sportspeople
South African LGBT rights activists
South African lesbians
People from Springs, Gauteng
People murdered in South Africa
Rape in South Africa
South Africa women's international soccer players
South African women's soccer players
South African murder victims
South African victims of anti-LGBT hate crimes
Lesbian sportswomen
LGBT association football players
Lesbophobic violence
Women's association football midfielders
Sportspeople from Gauteng
20th-century South African LGBT people
Violence against women in South Africa